G. A. S.  may mean

 George Augustus Sala
 George Alexander Stevens